62 Arietis is a single star in the northern constellation of Aries, a few degrees to the north of Tau Arietis. 62 Arietis is the Flamsteed designation. It is visible to the naked eye as a dim, yellow-hued star with an apparent visual magnitude of 5.52.

This object is an aging giant star with a stellar classification of G5 III, most likely (96% chance) on the horizontal branch. Having exhausted the supply of hydrogen at its core, the star has expanded to 35 times the Sun's radius. It is around 219 million years old with 3.7 times the mass of the Sun. The star is radiating 533 times the Sun's luminosity from its enlarged photosphere at an effective temperature of 4,665 K.

Chinese name

In Chinese astronomy, 62 Arietis is called 天阿, Pinyin: Tiānhé, meaning Celestial River, because this star is marking itself and stand alone in Celestial River asterism, Hairy Head mansion (see : Chinese constellation). 天阿 (Tiānhé) is westernized into Teen Ho, but according to another opinion about this asterism, Teen Ho is asterism consisting four stars in Aries.

Another "Tiānhé" (Celestial River) in Tail mansion, is asterism consisting the stars in Ophiuchus

References

External links
Aladin previewer
Aladin sky atlas
 HR 1012

G-type giants
Horizontal-branch stars
Aries (constellation)
Durchmusterung objects
Arietis, 62
020825
015696
1012